The Javanese flying squirrel (Iomys horsfieldii) is a species of rodent in the family Sciuridae. It is found in Indonesia, Malaysia, and Singapore.

References

Iomys
Rodents of Indonesia
Rodents of Malaysia
Mammals described in 1838
Taxonomy articles created by Polbot